Tim Keating is an American football coach and former player.  He is currently a volunteer assistant at Stetson University. He was the head football coach at the Wesley College in Dover, Delaware, a position he has held since the 1988 to 1992.

From 1993 to 2011, Keating served as the head coach at McDaniel College, winning over 100 games and becoming the program's winningest coach.

Head coaching record

College

See also
 List of college football coaches with 100 losses

References

External links
 Stetson profile

Living people
Bethany Bison football players
Georgetown Hoyas football coaches
DePauw Tigers football coaches
Penn Quakers football coaches
Rice Owls football coaches
Wesley Wolverines football coaches
McDaniel Green Terror football coaches
Stetson Hatters football coaches
Year of birth missing (living people)